The IX Games of the Small States of Europe were held in 2001 by the Republic of San Marino.

Competitions
Numbers in parentheses indicate the number of medal events contested in each sport.

Medal count

References

San Marino Olympic committee
Athletics results (archived)

 
Games of the Small States of Europe
Games Of The Small States Of Europe, 2001
Games Of The Small States Of Europe
Games Of The Small States Of Europe
Games Of The Small States Of Europe
Multi-sport events in San Marino
International sports competitions hosted by San Marino